The Capitol, North O Street and South Washington Railway was a street railway company in Washington, D.C., from 1875 to 1898. It was the sixth and final company to start during the horse car era. It operated on a loop, or "belt," around downtown and the National Mall. For that reason, and because of its long name, it was known colloquially as the Belt Railway. It changed its name to the Belt Railway in 1893. It expanded north and south on 11th street west to the boundaries of the city. In 1896 it attempted to use compressed air motors instead of electricity, a decision that sent them into receivership. In 1898, the company was purchased by the Anacostia and Potomac River Railroad and the company ceased to exist.

Origins
The Capitol, North O Street and South Washington Railway Company was the last streetcar company to begin operations during Washington's horsecar era. It was incorporated on March 3, 1875, and began operation later that year.  Its circular route went from the Capitol along 1st Street SW; south of the Mall on Maryland and Virginia Avenues SW; north on 12th Street SW/NW, the old Ohio Avenue NW (now obliterated by Federal Triangle) and 14th Street NW to O Street NW; east on O Street NW for ten blocks; and then south on 4th Street NW, G Street NW and 1st Street NW.

Expansion and name change
The Capitol, North O Street and South Washington went through several changes after its initial startup. A P Street NW track was added in 1876 for westbound cars, leaving O Street NW for eastbound traffic. In 1881, the 11th street line was extended north to Boundary Street and south to Water Street SW and along that street to the Arsenal. At the same time, tracks were rerouted across the Mall. The last change came on February 18, 1893, when it changed its name to the Belt Railway Company.

Switch to electricity
In 1896 Congress directed the Belt Railway to try out compressed air motors, just as it had the Eckington and Soldier's Home.  The compressed air motors were a failure and in 1899 the company's cars were equipped with the standard underground power system.

Bankruptcy and purchase
As a result of the compressed air motor fiasco, the company went into receivership. Shortly thereafter, on June 24, 1898, the Anacostia and Potomac River purchased the Belt Railway.

Notes 

Street railways in Washington, D.C.
Defunct Washington, D.C., railroads
1875 establishments in Washington, D.C.
1898 disestablishments in Washington, D.C.
American companies established in 1875